Cory Witherill (born December 17, 1971) is a Native American Navajo race car driver from Los Angeles in the Indy Racing League, Infiniti Pro Series, Indy Lights, and ARCA series. He made an incredible bump day run on a brand new engine to qualify for the 2001 Indianapolis 500, becoming the only full-blooded Native American to race in the Indy 500. He finished 19th. In 2002 and 2003, with the collapse of the IRL team he drove for, he went to the Infiniti Pro Series driving for Ron Hemelgarn Racing. In 2002, he had 8 podium finishes and 1 win at Nashville Superspeedway. He attempted to become the first full-blooded Native American in NASCAR.

Personal life
He currently lives in Santa Monica, with his wife Jennifer Khasnabis (former reporter for MotorWeek TV). Their first child, Graham Liston Witherill, was born in September 2009. In late 2017, the couple announced they were separating, and subsequently filed for divorce.

Career results

CART PPG/Dayton Indy Lights

IndyCar Series
(key)

Indianapolis 500

Infiniti Pro Series

External links
Driver Database Profile

IndyCar Series drivers
Indianapolis 500 drivers
Indy Lights drivers
Navajo sportspeople
ARCA Menards Series drivers
American Speed Association drivers
Living people
1971 births
Racing drivers from Los Angeles
U.S. F2000 National Championship drivers